Johanna Maria Louise Loisinger (18 April 1865 – 20 July 1951) was an Austrian actress, pianist and operatic soprano singer. She was born in Preßburg, Austria (today Bratislava), the daughter of John Loisinger and Maria Meier.

After she had completed her singing studies, Loisinger sang in Prague, Troppau (today Opava), Linz and at the court theatre in Darmstadt. She was a well-known singer of the works of Mozart.

Loisinger married Prince Alexander of Battenberg (1857–1893) on 6 February 1889 in Menton, Alpes-Maritimes, France. The prince had resigned from the Bulgarian throne in 1886 and had assumed the style of Count von Hartenau, so Loisinger became the Countess von Hartenau. The couple settled in Graz, Austria, and had two children, Assen Ludwig Alexander (1890–1965) and Marie Therese Vera Zvetana (1893–1935). After her husband's early death, she moved to Vienna, where she was an active patron of musical organisations. Among other posts, she was president of the Vienna Symphony.

Loisinger died on 20 July 1951 in Vienna. She was buried in St. Leonhard Cemetery in Graz where her daughter Zvetana was previously buried.

References

External links

1865 births
1951 deaths
Johanna
Actors from Bratislava
Austrian operatic sopranos
19th-century Austrian actresses
Austrian women pianists
20th-century Austrian women opera singers
19th-century Austrian women opera singers
Musicians from Bratislava
Musicians from Vienna
19th-century women pianists
20th-century women pianists